Håkon Gullvåg (born 20 February 1959) is a Norwegian painter.

References

1959 births
20th-century Norwegian painters
Norwegian male painters
21st-century Norwegian painters
Living people
Place of birth missing (living people)
20th-century Norwegian male artists
21st-century Norwegian male artists